"Little Bitty Girl" is a song released in 1960 by Bobby Rydell. The song spent 15 weeks on the Billboard Hot 100 chart, peaking at No. 19. In Canada, it reached No. 2, co-charting with "Wild One".

Chart performance

References

1960 songs
1960 singles
Bobby Rydell songs
Cameo Records singles
Songs written by Clint Ballard Jr.
Songs written by Fred Tobias